The Doctor of Stalingrad ( also known as Battle Inferno) is a 1958 German drama film directed by Géza von Radványi and starring O.E. Hasse, Eva Bartok and Hannes Messemer. It is an adaptation of the 1956 novel The Doctor of Stalingrad by Heinz G. Konsalik.  The film addresses the issue of German Prisoners of War held by the Soviet Union in camps well into the 1950s. The principal character Doctor Fritz Böhler was loosely modelled on Ottmar Kohler, known as the "Angel of Stalingrad".

The film's sets were designed by the art directors Willy Schatz and Robert Stratil.

Main cast
 O.E. Hasse as  Doctor Fritz Böhler
 Eva Bartok as Captain Alexandra Kasalinskaja
 Hannes Messemer as Oberleutnant Pjotr Markow
 Mario Adorf as Pelz, Sanitäter
 Walter Reyer as Doctor Sellnow
 Vera Tschechowa as Tamara
 Paul Bösiger as Fähnrich Peter Schultheiß
 Leonard Steckel as Major Dr. Kresin, Distriktarzt
 Valéry Inkijinoff as Oberstleutnant Worotilow, Lagerkommandant
 Michael Ande as Sergej, Worotilows Sohn
 Siegfried Lowitz as Walter Grosse
 Til Kiwe as Sauerbrunn
 Wilmut Borell as Pastor
 Rolf von Nauckhoff as Oberst Eklund, Swedish Red Cross

References

Bibliography

External links

1958 films
West German films
German war drama films
1950s German-language films
1950s Russian-language films
Eastern Front of World War II films
World War II prisoner of war films
Films directed by Géza von Radványi
Films based on German novels
Films set in the 1940s
Films set in the 1950s
Films set in 1958
Films about the Battle of Stalingrad
Medical-themed films
Gloria Film films
German World War II films
1950s multilingual films
German multilingual films
1950s German films